Helicometrina is a genus of trematodes in the family Opecoelidae.

Species
Helicometrina execta (Linton, 1910) Overstreet, 1969
Helicometrina indica Dhanumkumari, 1999
Helicometrina labrisomi Oliva, Valdivia, Chavez, Molina & Cárdenas, 2015
Helicometrina mirzai Siddiqi & Cable, 1960
Helicometrina nimia Linton, 1910
Helicometrina otolithi Bilqees, 1972
Helicometrina plectorhynchii Jehan, 1973
Helicometrina qatarensis Saoud, Ramadan & Al-Kawari, 1988
Helicometrina quadrorchis Manter & Pritchard, 1960
Helicometrina scomberi Gupta & Jahan, 1977
Helicometrina unica Gupta & Puri, 1985

Species later synonymised with species of Helicometrina
Helicometrina execta (Linton, 1910) Overstreet, 1969
Helicometra execta Linton, 1910
Helicometrina parva Manter, 1933
Helicometrina trachinoti Siddiqi & Cable, 1960
Helicometrina nimia Linton, 1910
Helicometrina chilomycteri Bilqees, 1976
Helicometrina delicatulus Bilqees, 1972
Helicometrina elongata Noble & Park, 1937
Helicometrina hexorchis Gupta & Sehgal, 1970
Helicometrina karachiensis Bilqees, 1972
Helicometrina orientalis Srivastava, 1936
Helicometrina septorchis Srivastava, 1936

References

Opecoelidae
Plagiorchiida genera